Rhinella macrorhina is a species of toad in the family Bufonidae.
It is endemic to Colombia.
Its natural habitat is subtropical or tropical moist montane forests.
It is threatened by habitat loss.

References 

Rhamphophryne
Amphibians of Colombia
Taxonomy articles created by Polbot
Amphibians described in 1971